Adeyemi I was the last independent ruler of the Oyo Empire. He ruled from 1876 to 1905. Starting in 1888 he came under increasing British control with his independence clearly ended by 1896. He was the Alaafin during the 16 years Yoruba civil war which went on from 1877-1893.

References

Oyo Empire
19th-century births
20th-century deaths
Year of birth missing
Year of death missing